5 Ahead is the seventh studio album by Japanese band Tokio. It was released on December 5, 2001. It was the first album to be released under Universal Music Japan. The album reached eighth place on the Oricon weekly chart and charted for six weeks.

The name of the album is a pun: 5 in Japanese is pronounced Go; thus, the real name of the album is GO AHEAD.

Track listing

Disc 1

Disc 2

Personnel 

 Shigeru Joshima – guitar
 Tomoya Nagase – lead vocalist, guitar
 Masahiro Matsuoka – drums
 Taichi Kokubun – keyboard
 Tatsuya Yamaguchi – bass

References 

2001 albums
Tokio (band) albums